Psilopyga is a genus of sap-feeding beetles in the family Nitidulidae. There are at least four described species in Psilopyga.

Species
These four species belong to the genus Psilopyga:
 Psilopyga fasciata
 Psilopyga histrina LeConte, 1853 (black stinkhorn beetle)
 Psilopyga lata (Spornraft, 1971)
 Psilopyga nigripennis LeConte, 1863 (stinkhorn beetle)

References

Further reading

 
 

Nitidulidae
Articles created by Qbugbot